Matthijs Huizing (born 10 October 1960 in Leiden) is a Dutch politician and former (sports) manager. As a member of the People's Party for Freedom and Democracy (Volkspartij voor Vrijheid en Democratie) he was an MP since 26 October 2010, until 6 December 2013. He left after he had been recently arrested for driving under the influence. He focused on matters of supervisors, accountancy, social security, aviation, ship transport, inland navigation and harbors.

From 1980 to 1984, he was a member and also VVD fraction leader of the municipal council of the ward Kralingen-Crooswijk and from 2002 to 2008, and also till 2007 VVD fraction leader of the municipal council of Oegstgeest.

Huizing studied economics (BA) as well as administration of business (MA) at Erasmus University Rotterdam.

References 

  Parlement.com biography

External links 
  Matthijs Huizing personal website
  House of Representatives biography
  People's Party for Freedom and Democracy website

1960 births
Living people
Dutch businesspeople
Municipal councillors of Kralingen-Crooswijk
Municipal councillors in South Holland
Dutch sports executives and administrators
Erasmus University Rotterdam alumni
Members of the House of Representatives (Netherlands)
People from Leiden
People from Oegstgeest
People's Party for Freedom and Democracy politicians
21st-century Dutch politicians